Juraj Štěch (born 25 April 1968) is a Slovak wrestler. He competed in the men's freestyle 130 kg at the 1992 Summer Olympics.

References

1968 births
Living people
Slovak male sport wrestlers
Olympic wrestlers of Czechoslovakia
Wrestlers at the 1992 Summer Olympics
Sportspeople from Liptovský Mikuláš